James Hitchmough (21 September 1934 – 11 May 1997) was a TV comedy writer, teacher and academic.  He was best known for the long-running television sitcom Watching, but also wrote for Coronation Street and Brookside; and a feature-length TV film The Bullion Boys.

References

External links
Coronation Street writers

1934 births
1997 deaths
British comedy writers
British television writers
20th-century screenwriters